Bishops Town (Welsh: Tre'r Esgob) is an area in the  community of Llywel, Powys, Wales, which is 38 miles (61 km) from Cardiff and 153 miles (246 km) from London.

References

See also
List of localities in Wales by population

Villages in Powys